Alexis Hernández (born December 20, 1984) is a motorcyclist and pilot of Peruvian ATVs, has been multiple champion of national motorcycling tournaments in different modalities. He participated in editions of the Dakar Series. He debuted in the 2013 Dakar Rally in the ATV category.

Dakar Rally results

See also
 Sports in Peru

References

External links 
  
 Driver profile at Worldrallyraid.com

1984 births
People from Lima
Living people
Dakar Rally drivers
Dakar Rally motorcyclists
Peruvian motorcycle racers
Off-road motorcycle racers
Enduro riders